Calum "Baldy" MacKay (January 1, 1927 — August 21, 2001) was a Canadian professional ice hockey winger. He played in the National Hockey League with the Detroit Red Wings and Montreal Canadiens between 1947 and 1955. With Montreal he won the Stanley Cup in 1953. MacKay was born in Toronto, Ontario.

Career
MacKay started his professional career by playing five games for the Detroit Red Wings in 1947. The next season, he split his time between the Omaha Knights of the United States Hockey League and the Indianapolis Capitals of the American Hockey League. In 1949, He was called up to Detroit for one game before being sent back to Indianapolis. In 1950, he joined the Montreal Canadiens where he played three years before being sent to the Buffalo Bisons for most of 1952 and all of 1953. He re-joined the Montreal Canadiens for the 1953 playoffs where he helped the Canadiens win the Stanley Cup defeating the Boston Bruins in the 1953 Stanley Cup Finals. He played two more seasons for the Canadiens before he suffered a knee injury on September 30, 1955, during training camp.

Career statistics

Regular season and playoffs

Awards
1953 NHL All Star  (Montreal)

External links
 

1927 births
2001 deaths
Buffalo Bisons (AHL) players
Canadian ice hockey forwards
Detroit Red Wings players
Indianapolis Capitals players
Montreal Canadiens players
Montreal Royals (QSHL) players
Omaha Knights (USHL) players
Oshawa Generals players
Ice hockey people from Toronto
Stanley Cup champions